Shizar (also Romanized as Shīzar; also known as Chīzar) is a village in Khandan Rural District, Tarom Sofla District, Qazvin County, Qazvin Province, Iran. At the 2006 census, its population was 125, in 42 families.

References 

Populated places in Qazvin County